HaAh HaGadol 10 (lit. The Big Brother 10) is the tenth season of the Israeli version of the reality show Big Brother. The season premiered on 1 January 2020 on Reshet 13. Applications for this season started on 2 September 2018 after season 9 ended on 1 September 2018.

Liron Weizman and Guy Zu-Aretz co-host the show. In addition, model Eden Fines, as the "Digital Sister", who talks about everything happening in the house on Facebook, Instagram, the show's website and the Big Brother app.

The finale was on 4 April 2020, and the winner was Tikva Gidon.

Housemates
Just hours before the show was launched and the housemates entered the Big Brother house, the production decided that one of the contestants, the plus-size model Orel Alloushe, who was supposed to enter the house during the show would not enter, after the discovery of a wrapper of Escitalopram on the hotel floor, by production team, and fear that others will use them. The production company stated in response: "It was indeed decided that one of the contestants who was supposed to enter the Big Brother house this evening would not enter." Orel was revealed to be the one of the housemate entered the house on 24 December 2019.
Therefore, in the last minute's change, Orel was replaced by the former Knesset member Oren Hazan three days after the season's premiere.

On Day 46, six new housemates entered the house.

Nominations table

Notes

: On Day 1, Big Brother handed out 3 different secret missions. For the first mission, Tikva had to impersonate a seventh-month pregnant woman for a week. In the second mission, Nir, the atheist had to impersonate a religious settler. The third mission was for Assif to ensure that the true identities of Tikva and Nir would not be revealed. If either Tikva or Nir succeeded in their missions, they would gain immunity from the first nomination. If Asif succeeded in his mission, all housemates would earn a luxury shopping budget. Only Nir succeed in his mission, thus receiving immunity.
: Oren Hazan entered the house for only a week.
: The nominees of the first week were determined by the "Great Writer" mission.
: Adam was chosen by the viewers as the first evictee, but was saved because of Oren's decision to abolish the eviction.
 As punishment for discussing nominations, Yarden was automatically nominated for eviction on Day 12.
: On Day 12, as the result of the mission, Tikva would not be able to nominate and Adam was automatically nominated until further notice.
: Big Brother decided Ruth could save one of the nominees and nominate another one. Ruth chose to save Nir and replaced them with Mishel.
: Following a mission, Yosi was given the power to save one of the nominees and nominate someone else. Yosi chose to save Gad and replaced them with Tikva.
: As punishment for discussing nominations, Emilie was automatically nominated for eviction. 
: In the time task, Lior was able to add minutes to the task or cancel the permanent nomination of Adam. He chose to cancel the permanent nomination of Adam.
: Following the telephone mission, Tikva was able to nominate, but she had to nominate in public.
: As punishment for discussing nominations, Lior was automatically nominated for eviction. 
: As punishment for constantly breaking the rules of discussion of information from the outside world since his arrival on Day 46, Alon was ejected from the Big Brother House.
: Kfir won the mission and removed himself from the nomination list and nominated Asif in his place.
: Alon was removed from the nomination list after being ejected from the Big Brother House.
: The fake nomination list was determined by the "nomination games" mission.
: The real eviction, each housemate puts on an image of one housemate of their choice on the wheel. After it finished, Tikva spun the wheel and pointer of the wheel landed on Nir's sections means Nir was evicted. But it was revealed on stage that it is a fake eviction, Nir will stay in a suite for a few days.
: The housemates nominated as normal, and Nir, who spends his time in the suite and succeeded in the secret mission, therefore, was given the power to make a nomination list of his own. The viewers will decide which one is the final nomination list. The viewers chose the housemates' nomination list.
: Yosi was elected Prime Minister and as a result, he was granted immunity and the power to evict one of the two housemates who received the fewest votes from the house. During the live show, Yosi had to choose between Noam and Shirley to evict, he chose Noam.
: Adam was automatically nominated for breaking the rules.
: Gad was automatically nominated for breaking the rules.
: There were two evictions this week. For the second eviction, all housemates were nominated for eviction.
: The public was voting to win rather than to save.

Nominations totals received

References

External links
  

2020 Israeli television seasons
10
Television series impacted by the COVID-19 pandemic